Bai Yu (born 8 April 1990) is a Chinese actor. 
He is best known for his roles in the dramas Love O2O (2016), Memory Lost (2016), Suddenly This Summer (2018), Guardian (2018), Detective L (2019), The Long Night (2020), The Bond (2021), and The Wind Blows from Longxi (2022).

Early life and education
Bai was born in Xi'an, Shaanxi, China on April 8, 1990. He graduated from the Central Academy of Drama with a bachelor's degree in performance.

Biography
In 2014, Bai made his acting debut in the web drama 0.5 Diors.

In 2015, Bai starred in the youth medical drama Grow Up, portraying a rebellious yet realistic intern. The same year, he was cast in the modern romance dramas Above the Clouds and Hello, Joann.

In 2016, Bai gained recognition with his role in the war drama Young Marshal directed by Zhang Li. He gained further recognition with his supporting role in the hit romantic comedy drama Love O2O. He then played the leading role in the crime mystery web drama Memory Lost, adapted from Ding Mo's novel of the same name. The series was a hit in China and led to increased popularity for Bai. 

In 2017, Bai starred in the patriotic film The Founding of an Army, portraying Cai Qingchuan. He received positive reviews for his performance.

In 2018, Bai starred in the acclaimed youth melodrama Suddenly This Summer. The series was nominated for the 32nd China TV Drama Flying Apsaras Awards for Outstanding Television Series. He then starred in the science fiction mystery web drama Guardian. The series developed a cult following online and led to increased popularity for Bai. Forbes China listed Bai under their 30 Under 30 Asia 2017 list  which consisted of 30 influential people under 30 years old who have had a substantial effect in their fields. 

In 2019, Bai appeared in CCTV's spring gala for the first time, performing the song item "Child of Generation". He starred in the republican detective drama Detective L. He also featured in the family drama film Looking Up, winning Breakthrough Film Actor at the Tencent Vido All Star Awards and Film Actor of the Year at the Tencent Entertainment White Paper.  He ranked 36th on Forbes China Celebrity 100 list. 

In 2020, Bai starred in the fantasy romance drama Fairyland Lovers. He ranked 68th on Forbes China Celebrity 100 list. In October of the same year, Bai impressed with his emotional performance in the highly acclaimed crime drama The Long Night. 

In September of 2021, Bai played the leading role in the Daylight Entertainment family drama The Bond. The series received mainly positive reviews and was selected by National Radio and Television Administration as one of the dramas of the year.  

In April of 2022, Bai starred in the historical drama The Wind Blows from Longxi adapted from Ma Boyong's novel of the same name. The series was praised by critics and Douban gave it 8.1 out of 10.

Filmography

Film

Television series

Short film

Television show

Discography

Awards and nominations

References

External links

Living people
1990 births
21st-century Chinese male actors
Chinese male film actors
Chinese male television actors
Male actors from Xi'an
Central Academy of Drama alumni